Cantharellus subpruinosus is a species of fungus in the family Cantharellaceae. A European species, it was originally described from France in 2000, where it was found growing in moss in mixed deciduous and spruce woodland.

References

External links

subpruinosus
Edible fungi
Fungi described in 2000
Fungi of Europe